The 2022–23 NCHC men's ice hockey season is the 10th season of play for National Collegiate Hockey Conference and will take place during the 2022–23 NCAA Division I men's ice hockey season. The regular season is set to begin on October 1, 2022 and conclude on March 4, 2023. The conference tournament is scheduled to begin in mid March, 2023.

Coaches

Records

Standings

Non-Conference record
Of the sixteen teams that are selected to participate in the NCAA tournament, ten will be via at-large bids. Those 10 teams are determined based upon the PairWise rankings. The rankings take into account all games played but are heavily affected by intra-conference results. The result is that teams from leagues which perform better in non-conference are much more likely to receive at-large bids even if they possess inferior records overall.

NCHC had a good season against non-conference opponents. While only one member team had a losing record outside of league play (Colorado College), three teams were only just above .500. Additionally, most of the conference's wins came against either the CCHA or Independent programs, many of which were low-ranked teams and didn't help the NCHC's position as much as they otherwise could have. This caused the NCHC to have just three teams in the top 15 of the rankings as opposed to the five they had the year before with a nearly-identical overall record.

Regular season record

Statistics

Leading scorers
GP = Games played; G = Goals; A = Assists; Pts = Points; PIM = Penalties in minutes

Leading goaltenders
Minimum 1/3 of team's minutes played in conference games.
GP = Games played; Min = Minutes played; W = Wins; L = Losses; T = Ties; GA = Goals against; SO = Shutouts; SV% = Save percentage; GAA = Goals against average

Conference tournament

NCAA tournament

Ranking

USCHO

USA Today

Pairwise

Note: teams ranked in the top-10 automatically qualify for the NCAA tournament. Teams ranked 11-16 can qualify based upon conference tournament results.

References

External links

2022–23
NCHC
2022–23